The Department of Instrumental Music at the Rabindra Bharati University, Kolkata was established in 1976. The department offers teaching in sitar, sarod, violin, flute and esraj under the ‘Tata-Sushir Wing’.  In the other wing, known as ‘Avanaddha Wing’, the students are exposed to three membrane percussion, namely, tabla, pakhawaj and shreekhol.   The programs also expose the students to the World Music. The reason of including World Music in the curriculum is to connect the students with world of musical creations in some way. This helps the students to start working more comfortably under the global scene. The postgraduate students work on a small research project that introduces them to serious research.
At the advanced level the study of computer for musical applications, like sound editing, musical score writing, primary acoustic analysis and the likes are included. These courses help the students to be more adaptable to the Music Industry and also help in Music Research. The department published 'Atodya' [July, 2014], the first refereed journal in Music published [online] by any Indian university.

Teaching Facilities 
The curriculum emphasizes actual executions of the provided information.  Sixty percent of the syllabus is practical courses.

Department provides additional support to weaker students by arranging special tutorials. As a routine the new students receive a week -long intensive performance workshop.  This helps to develop some quick orientation of the required performance abilities under different programs. This is also an identifying process to plan the special classes for weaker and exceptionally good students. The department is planning to launch a project to open up a kind of country-wide performance space for the outstanding students. In 2010 the department has shifted to for semester and credit system for its M.A. programs. This has opened up wider possibilities for international student exchanges.

Research programs 
The department offers M.Phil, the pre-research program and Ph.D. program.
The programs run under the M.Phil and Ph.D. Regulations -2009 relating to the Provisions, Minimum Standards and Procedure for Award of the Degree of Doctor of Philosophy (Ph.D.) on the basis of the Gazette Notification of UGC (Minimum standards and procedure for awards of M.Phil. / Ph.D. Degree) Regulations, 2009 on 11 July 2009 for its Faculty of Fine Arts, Faculty of Visual Arts and Faculty of Arts.

M.Phil 
A student with M.A. degree in relevant subject may apply for entry to M.Phil. program. M.Phil program exposes the students to different research methodologies, different widely used research tool like IT applications, relevant outlines of acoustical analysis, relevant outlines statistical analysis, Book reviews, and other research tools. The program also offers Writing Lab so that the students can master the techniques planning the write-ups, building up the write-up, exact statement of research applications and so on. The program also revisits some important areas of the subject. The syllabus outline of the M.Phil. program meets the ugc guidelines, but the students are not going to receive any grant from UGC.

Ph.D. 
For entry to the Ph.D. program there will be Entrance Test for students possessing M.A. degree. The entrance test is waved for students with M.Phil. or those already cleared NET National Eligibility Test of University Grants Commission, India.

Visiting scholars and musicians 

Notable musicians and thinkers visit the department for workshops, seminars, concerts and lectures. Some of the past visitors include Ravi Shankar, Ali Akbar Khan, V. G. Jog, Buddhadev Dasgupta, Zakir Hussain, Swapan Chaudhuri and Philip Bohlman from the University of Chicago.

References 

Department of Instrumental Music, Rabindra Bharati University [Working site for the department's students and scholars as special additional facility.

External links 
 Department of Instrumental Music, Rabindra Bharati University

Rabindra Bharati University
Music schools in India
University departments in India
Memorials to Rabindranath Tagore
1976 establishments in West Bengal